Friedrich Wilhelm Freiherr von Erdmannsdorff (18 May 1736 – 9 March 1800) was a German architect and architectural theoretician, and one of the most significant representatives of early German Neoclassicism during the Age of Enlightenment. His work included Wörlitz Palace in the present-day Dessau-Wörlitz Garden Realm, one of the earliest Palladian buildings on the European continent. His most well-known student was Friedrich Gilly, the teacher of Karl Friedrich Schinkel.

Life
Erdmannsdorff was born in Dresden to the Saxon courtier, Baron Ernst Ferdinand von Erdmannsdorff, and his wife Henriette Margarethe, née von Heßler.

After early stages of education with Jakob Mauvillon in Leipzig and at the Dresden knight academy from 1750 to 1754, Erdmannsdorff attended the University of Wittenberg in 1754–1758, where he encountered Prince Franz von Anhalt-Dessau, whose service he entered in 1758. His later fame is due his works for the prince in his Wörlitz pleasureground near the Dessau residence. At the age of twenty three Erdmannsdorff become a Freemason and was initiated at the illustrious Minerva Zu Den Drei Palmen (Minerva to the three palm trees) lodge on 23 August 1759.

In accordance with the educational ideals of the Enlightenment, the prince had the aim of reorganising his surrounding lands into a cohesive 'Garden Realm' (Gartenreich) in the style of an English landscape garden. In addition to the beautification of the landscape, cottages of various architectural styles, antique temples, bridges and memorials were to be erected and to be made accessible to everyone. Franz employed his friend and architect Erdmannsdorff to design the architectural arrangement of the grounds.

Between 1761 and 1775 on several grand tours to Italy, Holland, England, France and Switzerland, Erdmannsdorff gathered ideas for the architectural arrangement of the Wörlitz grounds. Accompanying the Prince, he got to know the style of the Scottish architects Robert and James Adam (the Adams Style). At the same time he was impressed by the architect William Chambers. In Rome Erdmannsdorff made the acquaintance of the archaeologist Johann Joachim Winckelmann and the painter Charles Louis Clérisseau, and contacted the master builder Giovanni Battista Piranesi and painter Jakob Philipp Hackert.

The contemporary art and culture of England made a particular impression on Erdmannsdorff as well as Prince Franz. The Palladian architecture in England, inspired by the Palladian Villas of the 16th century, can be seen replicated in Erdmannsdorff's later creations and was the strongest influence on his work next to the architecture and interior design of ancient Rome. In this artistic context he designed, amongst others, Wörlitz Palace, built from 1769 to 1773 for Prince Franz and his consort Louise of Brandenburg-Schwedt.

Although Erdmannsdorff favoured this particular architectural style, he also created buildings in the Neo-Gothic style preferred by Prince Franz. Among others, he converted the influences he had received on his trip to England into the building of the Gothic House in the Wörlitz Grounds.

During his time in Anhalt-Dessau, Erdmannsdorff married Wilhelmine von Ahlimb in 1781, with whom he had two daughters.

In 1786 King Frederick William II of Prussia called on his services to redecorate the bedroom and study of his predecessor, Frederick the Great, in Sanssouci Palace in Potsdam, as well a number of rooms in the Berliner Stadtschloss (Berlin City Palace). Consequently, the first consistently classical interior of the Potsdam and Berlin palaces was built to Erdmannsdorff's specifications. During his stay in Berlin and Potsdam which lasted until 1789, he became an honorary member of the 'Royal Academy of Arts and Mechanical Sciences' in Berlin. Apart from this work he was above all active as a consultant in the areas of art, culture and education in Brandenburg.

Between 1789 and 1790, Erdmannsdorff stayed again in Italy. In Rome he made the acquaintance of the painters Angelica Kauffman and Jakob Phillipp Hackert, as well as the sculptors Alexander Trippel, Antonio Canova and Bartolomeo Cavaceppi. After a trip to Weimar in 1791 with Prince Franz, he visited the courts of Gotha, Kassel and Karlsruhe. In 1796 he took over the artistic direction of the Chalkographische Gesellschaft in Dessau, founded in 1795, whose goal was to popularise artistic works through etchings. At this time he also worked as a lecturer at the Berlin School of Architecture, where he taught Friedrich Gilly among others.

Erdmannsdorff died in Dessau at the age of 64. His grave can be found at the New Graveyard (Neuer Begräbnisplatz, today known as Historical Cemetery I) in Dessau.

Works

Buildings in Wörlitz and the Wörlitz Grounds
 1767–1768 Nymphaeum
 1769–1773 Wörlitz Palace
 1770–1772 Kitchen Building with Summer Hall
 1769      Watchkeeper's house "the Horse" on the Elbe dyke
 1772      Red Watchkeeper's house on the Elbe dyke
 1773+1813 Gothic House
 1785–1787 Inn "The Oak Wreath"
 1787–1790 Wörlitz Synagogue
 1788      Frederike's Bridge
 1791–1794 Villa Hamilton (Rock island "Stone")
 1792–1795 Townhall
 1794      Temple of Venus
 1795–1797 Pantheon
 1796      Probstei
 1797–1798 Temple of Flora
as well as a number of other garden follies.

Dessau
 1767      Princess' Cabinet and Grand Ballroom in Dessau Palace
 1774–1778 Luisium Country House
 1780      Georgium Country House
 1775      Pavilions in the Palace Gardens
 1777      Palace Theatre
 nach 1780     Stranger's House and various small details in the Georgium Park
 nach 1780 House at 11/12 Poststraße
 nach 1780 House at 3 Schlossstraße
 nach 1780 52 Zerbster Straße
 1787      New Graveyard and Graveyard Porch
 1790–1791 Hippodrome
 1792      Stables and Court Equerry Residence
 1793      Orangery and Main Guards
 1796      Houses on the Mulde Bridge
 1798      House at 69 Zerbster Straße
 1798      Court Theatre
 1798      House at 10 Wallstraße

Potsdam
 1786      Conversion of the bedroom and study of Frederick the Great in the classical style in Sanssouci Palace

Berlin
 1787–1789 Conversion of a few rooms in the Berliner Stadtschloss (Rally Hall, Grand Column Hall, Blue French Chambers, Green French Chambers, Banquet Hall)

Notes

References
This article is based on a translation of the German Wikipedia article Friedrich Wilhelm von Erdmannsdorff.

External links 
The Royal Chambers of Frederick William II 
 

1736 births
1800 deaths
Architects from Dresden
Barons of Germany
People from Dessau-Roßlau
German neoclassical architects
Architectural theoreticians